Madhuca motleyana is a tree in the family Sapotaceae. It is named for engineer and naturalist James Motley, who lived and worked in Borneo in the 1850s.

Description
The bark is greyish brown. Inflorescences bear up to 12 flowers. Madhuca motleyana produces nyatoh timber, suitable for furniture making.

Distribution and habitat
Madhuca motleyana is native to Thailand, Sumatra, Peninsular Malaysia and Borneo. Its habitat is swamps and forests from sea level to  altitude.

References

motleyana
Trees of Thailand
Trees of Sumatra
Trees of Peninsular Malaysia
Trees of Borneo
Plants described in 1860